The Tremont Avenue–177th Street station, at times associated as Bronx Borough Hall, was an express station on the demolished IRT Third Avenue Line in the Bronx, New York City. It was built by the Suburban Rapid Transit Company as 177th Street Station and had three tracks and two island platforms. It opened on July 20, 1891, and was the northern terminus of the Third Avenue elevated line until 1901, when more stations opened as the line was extended north. The next stop to the north was 180th Street for local trains and Fordham Road–190th Street for express trains. The next stop to the south for all trains was 174th Street. In its last years, a reconstructed section rose over the Cross Bronx Expressway at approximately 175th Street as part of the highway's development.

The station closed on April 29, 1973 and was demolished by 1977.

It was notable for being the station that served Bronx Borough Hall (1897–1969).

References

External links

IRT Third Avenue Line stations
Former elevated and subway stations in the Bronx
Railway stations in the United States opened in 1891
Railway stations closed in 1973
1891 establishments in New York (state)
1973 disestablishments in New York (state)
Tremont, Bronx
Third Avenue